The wedding dress of Princess Marina of Greece and Denmark was worn at her wedding to Prince George, Duke of Kent on 29 November 1934. The couple was married first in an Anglican ceremony at Westminster Abbey, followed by a private Greek Orthodox ceremony at Buckingham Palace. Princess Marina was the youngest daughter of Prince and Princess Nicholas of Greece and Denmark. Prince George was the fourth son of King George V and Queen Mary.

Design
The wedding dress was designed by Edward Molyneux, who had worked with Marina previously. The dress was made from white silk and silver lamé brocade, with a raised English rose design. The dress featured trumpet sleeves and a wide train. The fabric was woven in two weeks in Lyon, France, and  shipped to London to create the dress. At Princess Marina's request, the dress was sewn by Russian refugees, to aide the people of her mother's homeland who fled the Russian Revolution.

The dress's simplicity was praised in Vogue: "the sum of that simple perfection which distinguishes her whole Molyneux trousseau, and which only a fine personal taste could have achieved."

Princess Marina wore a tulle veil with a diamond fringe tiara belonging to her mother, Grand Duchess Elena Vladimirovna of Russia. She wore two small bunches of orange blossom over each ear. Princess Marina also wore a 34-stone diamond rivière necklace, which was a gift from King George V. The new Duchess of Kent wore the Royal Family Order of George V pinned to her left shoulder for the wedding photographs.

Princess Marina received a large amount of jewellery as wedding gifts, these included a fringe tiara given to her by the City of London, later worn by her daughter Princess Alexandra, daughter-in-law, Baroness Marie Christine von Reibnitz, and granddaughter, Lady Gabriella Windsor, on their wedding days. Queen Mary presented her new daughter-in-law with a sapphire and diamond parure which had belonged to her grandmother, the Duchess of Cambridge. Princess Nicholas gave her daughter a large diamond bow brooch and a pair of 18th-century diamond girandole earrings.

See also
 List of individual dresses

References

British royal attire
Marina of Greece and Denmark
1930s fashion